Lesley Bell is a female former international table tennis player from England.

Table tennis career
She represented England at the 1963 World Table Tennis Championships in the Corbillon Cup (women's team event) with Diane Rowe and Mary Shannon.

Two years later she won a bronze medal at the 1965 World Table Tennis Championships in the Corbillon Cup (women's team event) with Irene Ogus, Rowe and Shannon.

She represented Essex at county level and during 1962 became the youngest female representative (along with Ann Haydon) for England at senior level aged 15. Her mother Brenda Bell was three times England Veteran champion.

Personal life
She married Peter Radford in 1966. Her mother Brenda Bell was three times England Veteran champion.  Her husband Peter has also won the England Veteran Championships.  She had two children, Allan and Linda Radford, who competed at county and international level respectively.

See also
 List of England players at the World Team Table Tennis Championships

References

1946 births
Living people
World Table Tennis Championships medalists
English female table tennis players